Christmas Tale may refer to:

 A Christmas Tale (2008 French film) Un conte de Noël, a comedy-drama film
 Christmas Tales (2012 Norwegian album), Christmas album by Alexander Rybak
 The Country Mouse and the City Mouse: A Christmas Tale (1993 TV show)
 Rare Exports: A Christmas Tale (2010 film)
 Charlie Brown's Christmas Tales (2002 TV show)

See also
 Bugs Bunny's Looney Christmas Tales
 A Christmas Story (disambiguation)
 The Christmas Story (disambiguation)